Unrest is the eponymously titled debut studio album of Washington, D.C. Indie band Unrest, released on May 1, 1985 by TeenBeat Records.

Track listing

Personnel
Adapted from the Unrest liner notes.
Unrest
 Phil Krauth – drums, tambourine, voice (A6), production
 Tim Moran – bass guitar, guitar (A5, B4), voice (B6)
 Mark Robinson – lead vocals, guitar, piano, bass guitar (A5, B2, B4), production

Release history

References

1985 debut albums
Unrest (band) albums
Albums produced by Mark Robinson (musician)
TeenBeat Records albums